Era is the debut album by Eric Lévi's new-age project Era, first released in 1996 and re-released in 1998. Some editions include bonus track "After Time".

Use of Era music
 "Enae Volare (Mezzo)" is famous amongst mixed martial arts fans because it has been used as the entrance song of MMA legend Fedor Emelianenko.
 "Ameno" is used as the entrance theme song by Mexican wrestler Místico from CMLL (Sin Cara in WWE, Myzteziz in AAA) as well as mixed martial artist Aleksander Emelianenko.
 "Ameno" was used in Australia within "The Power of Yes" advertisements for Optus Communications. It was used in a World Cup 1998 commercial from MasterCard.
 Ameno played during Jennifer Hawkins' infamous wardrobe malfunction at Westfield Miranda on September 2, 2004.
 A remix of Ameno was made by DJ Quicksilver in 2000.
 A remix of "Mother" is also used in the 2001 film Driven.

Videos were shot for "Ameno", "Enae Volare" and "Mother" featuring actors Pierre Boisserie and Irene Bustamante.

Track listing

Personnel 
Eric Lévi: Keyboard, Prog., Lead Guitar (Mirror, After Time, Impera)
Guy Protheroe: Lead Vocal (Ameno, Enae Volare)
Eric Geisen: Lead Vocal (Cathar Rhythm)
Florence Dedam: Lead Vocal (Mother, After Time)
Murielle Lefebvre: Lead Vocal (Enae Volare Mezzo)
Harriet Jay: Lead Vocal (Ameno, Avemano, Cathar Rhythm 
Neil Wilkinson: Drums (Avemano)
Lee Sklar: Bass (Avemano)
Philippe Manca: Lead Guitar (Era, Ameno, Cathar Rhythm, Mother, Avemano, Sempire d'Amor, Enae Volare), Mandolin (Era), Drums/Bass prog. (Ameno, Era)

Charts

Weekly charts

Year-end charts

Certifications

References

Era (musical project) albums
1996 debut albums